Jason Porplyzia (born 27 November 1984 in Adelaide, South Australia) is a former Australian rules football player with a Ukrainian background in the Australian Football League.  He wore the number 40 for the Adelaide Football Club, and was known as a dangerous forward with a strong mark for his size. He was also widely regarded as one of the most accurate kicks for goal in the competition.  He was known by a number of nicknames, including "the Porpoise", Needles and Porps.

Early life
Porplyzia graduated from Sacred Heart College in 2002 where he regularly played in the First XVIII, and played an integral role in Sacred Heart College's 20 goal defeat of Assumption College, Kilmore as part of the annual intercollegiate exchange.  He was drafted by the Adelaide Crows and placed on their rookie list in 2003 but failed to impress the selectors enough to warrant elevation and was subsequently delisted. He then returned to the SANFL with West Adelaide, where he showed outstanding improvement, winning the club Best & Fairest award at the end of 2005.  Adelaide rewarded his hard work by reclaiming him in the 2006 pre-season draft.

AFL career
Proplyzia made his AFL debut in round 5, 2006 against the Western Bulldogs, in which he scored 3 goals in Adelaide's resounding victory. Porplyzia played 11 games for the season, the standout being a 25-possession effort against Melbourne in Round 22. He continued to impress in 2007 before finally beginning to make a name for himself as a small forward in 2008, where he repeatedly played through a recurring shoulder injury to almost single-handedly carry Adelaide into the finals in the absence of Brett Burton, and almost into the top four.

2009 was a breakthrough year for Porplyzia, he kicked 57 goals, 20 behinds making him Adelaide's leading goalscorer. He was favourite behind Mark LeCras to receive his first All Australian selection as the small forward pocket, but was controversially beaten by Leon Davis. Porplyzia is recognised as one of the most accurate set shots in the AFL, kicking 16 goals without a miss during 2009. He played his 50th match for the Crows in round 6 against Port Adelaide in Showdown XXIV, and booted three goals despite the Crows' loss. In the Crows round 21 match against the West Coast Eagles, Porplyzia booted his 100th goal in AFL footy, and also achieved a career high 6 goals. On 2 October Porplyzia was officially recognized for being Adelaide's leading goalscorer at the Best and Fairest awards. He also won the coaches award and finished runner up to Bernie Vince in the Best and Fairest by 2 votes.

In 2011 he injured his shoulder in the opening minutes of the first game and missed the rest of the season as he had a second shoulder reconstruction and focused on rehabilitation and strengthening.

He returned to play 22 games in 2012, including his 100th game in round 14 against Richmond, in which he kicked his 150th career goal.

Porplyzia retired from the AFL at the end of the 2014 season with a total of 130 games played in 10 seasons He then returned to West Adelaide in the SANFL in 2015 where he has helped the Bloods into the 2015 SANFL Grand Final and was named by coach Mark Mickan (himself a former West Adelaide and Crows club champion) to play on the half-back flank in the game at the Adelaide Oval.

Statistics

|- style="background:#eaeaea;"
| 2006
| 
| 40 || 11 || 10 || 11 || 76 || 49 || 125 || 44 || 27 || 0.9 || 1.0 || 6.9 || 4.5 || 11.4 || 4.0 || 2.5
|- 
| 2007
| 
| 40 || 15 || 15 || 10 || 105 || 100 || 205 || 56 || 36 || 1.0 || 0.7 || 7.0 || 6.7 || 13.7 || 3.7 || 2.4
|- style="background:#eaeaea;"
| 2008
| 
| 40 || 18 || 32 || 15 || 186 || 111 || 297 || 77 || 48 || 1.8 || 0.8 || 10.3 || 6.2 || 16.5 || 4.3 || 2.7
|- 
| 2009
| 
| 40 || 24 || 57 || 20 || 206 || 138 || 344 || 89 || 88 || 2.4 || 0.8 || 8.6 || 5.8 || 14.3 || 3.7 || 3.7
|- style="background:#eaeaea;"
| 2010
| 
| 40 || 19 || 22 || 17 || 159 || 122 || 281 || 71 || 59 || 1.2 || 0.9 || 8.4 || 6.4 || 14.8 || 3.7 || 3.1
|- 
| 2011
| 
| 40 || 1 || 1 || 0 || 1 || 0 || 1 || 1 || 1 || 1.0 || 0.0 || 1.0 || 0.0 || 1.0 || 1.0 || 1.0
|- style="background:#eaeaea;"
| 2012
| 
| 40 || 22 || 30 || 13 || 257 || 138 || 395 || 103 || 60 || 1.4 || 0.6 || 11.7 || 6.3 || 18.0 || 4.7 || 2.7
|- 
| 2013
| 
| 40 || 16 || 13 || 14 || 126 || 98 || 224 || 54 || 31 || 0.8 || 0.9 || 7.9 || 6.1 || 14.0 || 3.4 || 1.9
|- style="background:#eaeaea;"
| 2014
| 
| 40 || 4 || 1 || 0 || 21 || 12 || 33 || 8 || 6 || 0.3 || 0.0 || 5.3 || 3.0 || 8.3 || 2.0 || 1.5
|- class="sortbottom"
! colspan=3| Career
! 130
! 181
! 100
! 1137
! 768
! 1905
! 503
! 356
! 1.4
! 0.8
! 8.7
! 5.9
! 14.7
! 3.9
! 2.7
|}

References

External links

Adelaide Football Club players
1984 births
West Adelaide Football Club players
Adelaide Football Club (SANFL) players
Living people
Australian people of Ukrainian descent
Australian rules footballers from South Australia
Happy Valley Football Club players
People educated at Sacred Heart College, Adelaide